Elections to Cumbria County Council were held on 7 June 2001. This was on the same day as other UK county council elections. The Labour Party lost control of the council, and was now under no overall control.

Results

Results by electoral division

Allerdale

Aspatria & Wharrels

Bowness Thursby & Caldbeck

Cockermouth East

Cockermouth West

Dearham and Broughton

Harrington

Keswick & Derwent

Maryport East

Maryport West

Moorclose

Moss Bay

Seaton

Solway Coast

St John's

St Michaels

Wigton

Barrow-in-Furness

Dalton North

Dalton South

Hawcoat

Hindpool

Newbarns

Old Barrow

Ormsgill

Parkside

Risedale

Roosecote

Walney North

Walney South

Carlisle

Belah

Belle Vue

Botcherby

Brampton & Gilsland

Castle

Currock

Dalston & Cummersdale

Denton Holme

Harraby

Longtown & Bewcastle

Morton

St Aidans

Stanwix & Irthington

Stanwix Urban

Upperby

Wetheral

Yewdale

Copeland

Bransty

Cleator Moor North and Frizington

Cleator Moor South & Egremont

Distington & Moresby

Gosforth & Ennerdale

Hensingham & Arlecdon

Hillcrest

Kells and Sandwith

Millom

Mirehouse

Seascale & Whicham

St Bees & Egremont

Eden

Alston and East Fellside

Appleby

Eden Lakes

Greystoke and Hesket

Kirkby Stephen

Penrith East

Penrith North

Penrith Rural

Penrith West

South Lakeland

Cartmel

Grange

High Furness

Kendal Castle

Kendal Highgate

Kendal Nether

Kendal South

Kendal Strickland and Fell

Kent Estuary

Lakes

Low Furness

Lower Kentdale

Lyth Valley

Sedbergh and Kirkby Lonsdale

Ulverston East

Ulverston West

Upper Kent

Windermere

References

Cumbria
2001
1980s in Cumbria